The 1998 San Jose Clash season was the third season of the team's existence.

About
The 1998 season was one of excitement tempered by frustration. Quinn led the team to a 13-19 record, good for 33 points in MLS. San Jose was forced to play the first three home games of the season at Stanford University after winter rains delayed the renovation on Spartan Stadium. When the club returned to Spartan, they faced the New England Revolution May 3, 1998 on a newly widened field that was 70 yards wide and 110 yards long.

Ronald Cerritos again led the team, putting in 13 goals to finish the season as the eighth leading goal-scorer in the league. During the 1998 season the pieces of the eventual 2001 MLS Cup Champions began to form at Spartan Stadium. San Jose drafted eventual 2002 MLS all-star Wade Barrett was drafted in the first round of the 1998 College Draft, along with Alberto Montoya and Caleb Porter. Ben Parry was the 3rd overall selection in the 1998 College Draft but was forced into an early retirement with a rare stomach virus. San Jose picked up Francisco Uribe, Harut Karapetyan, and Brian Sebapole hoping to boost the Clash offense that already had Eddie Lewis, Jeff Baicher, Ronald Cerritos and Eric Wynalda, but failed to help lead the team to the playoffs. Karapetyan would return in 2000. Troy Dayak was shelved most of the season with a herniated disc in his neck and would be forced into retirement until 2001. Joe Cannon was called to the club from the A-League to serve as a backup for ten days before returning to soccer's minor leagues, he played the final 45 minutes against Toluca yielding 1 goal in an exhibition.  Defender Richard Gough enjoyed an all-star season in 1998, as he was the only member of the team selected to play in the mid-season classic. The club was forced to play through May and June without forward Eric Wynalda, who was with the United States National Team at the World Cup in France. Wynalda appeared in two matches for the U.S. during the World Cup. John Doyle continued to be a dominant defender and captained the squad in 1998. Caleb Porter had to miss the entire 1998 season with a knee injury but would return for 1999. He eventually went on to lead the Portland Timbers to an MLS Cup Championship.

Squad

Current squad

Competitions

Major League Soccer

Standings

Western Conference

Overall Table

Matches

(SO) = Shootout

U.S. Open Cup

Source:

References

External links
San Jose Earthquakes season stats | sjearthquakes.com
San Jose Earthquakes Game Results | Soccerstats.us
San Jose Earthquakes 100 Greatest Goals 1998 | YouTube

1998
San Jose Clash
San Jose Clash